Gravy Train!!!! were an electroclash band from Oakland, California. The band released material on the labels S.P.A.M. Records, Cold Crush, Kill Rock Stars, Cochon Records, and Retard Disco. The band had four members (represented by the four exclamation marks in the band name), that went by the pseudonyms Chunx, Funx, Hunx, and Junx. Chunx and Funx formed the band in 2001 as a vehicle for recording humiliating songs about an ex-lover. It was for this purpose that their first single, "Hella Nervous", was recorded. Shortly after, the two-piece recruited two openly gay backup dancers, Hunx and Drunx. Drunx was later replaced by Junx.

Gravy Train!!!! toured with Bratmobile and Le Tigre.

Discography

Albums
 Hello Doctor (2003)
 Are You Wigglin? (2005)
 All the Sweet Stuff (2007)

Singles
 "Ghost Boobs" (2004)

EPs
 The "Menz" (2002)

DVDs
 Stame the Batch! (2004)

References

External links 
 

Electronic music groups from California
Kill Rock Stars artists
Musical groups established in 2001
Musical groups disestablished in 2010
Musical groups from Oakland, California
Queercore groups
Retard Disco artists